The French submarine Fulton was a Joessel-class diesel-electric attack submarine built for the French Navy between 1913 and 1919. Fulton was built in the Arsenal de Cherbourg from 1913 to 1920, entered the French Marine Nationale in July 1920 and served until May 1936.

Design
Fulton was ordered in the French fleet's 1914 program as part of the two ship Joessel class. During construction, though, the idea was abandoned and the ships were instead equipped with diesel engines.

The boat's complement was 47 men.

Fulton was armed with eight 450 mm torpedo tubes (four in the bow, two stern and two external trainable mounts), with a total of 10 torpedoes and two  guns.

Service
Fulton was built in the Arsenal de Cherbourg. She was laid down in November 1913, launched on 1 April 1919, and was completed in July 1920. Fulton was named after Robert Fulton, the American inventor of the first commercially successful steamboat and first practical submarine, Nautilus, and received the pennant number Q 110.

She was refitted during the 1920s when she received a new conning tower, bridge and two periscopes of 7.5 m (at the conning tower) and 9.5 m (at Headquarters).

Fulton served in the Atlantic until the early 1930s when she was transferred to Indochina. She was stricken in May 1936.

Notes

References

Citations 

 

World War I submarines of France
Joessel-class submarines
1919 ships